Elena Albu (September 1, 1949 – March 16, 2003) was a Romanian stage and film actress.

She graduated from Caragiale Academy of Theatrical Arts and Cinematography in 1973.

Her acting career began in 1982; she starred in many productions directed by her husband Mircea Veroiu.

Her last theatrical role was in Oameni de zăpadă ("Snowmen"), directed by Louise Dănceanu at Bucharest's Teatrul Foarte Mic in the 1998-1999 season.

She died alone at her home, 16 March 2003, victim of a cerebral hemorrhage caused by arterial hypertension.

Filmography 
 Apachen (1973)
 Ilustrate cu flori de câmp (1974)
 Prin cenușa imperiului (1976)
 Între oglinzi paralele (1978)
 Falansterul (1979)
 Detașamentul Concordia (1980)
 Moara lui Călifar (1984)
 Surorile (1984)
 Somnul insulei (1994)
 Femeia în roșu (1997)

References

External links 

1949 births
2003 deaths
Actors from Iași
Romanian film actresses
Romanian stage actresses
Caragiale National University of Theatre and Film alumni
Film people from Iași